Elephant Butte Canyon or Lawhorn Canyon is a canyon in the Animas Mountains of Hidalgo County, New Mexico. Its stream is a tributary of Walnut Creek. Its mouth is located at elevation 5,535 feet / 1,687 feet at its confluence with Walnut Creek, just below Lawhorn Tank.

References

Landforms of Hidalgo County, New Mexico
Canyons and gorges of New Mexico
Rivers of New Mexico
Rivers of Hidalgo County, New Mexico